Taste This is a live album recorded during a stand-up comedy performance by Ellen DeGeneres, in which she talks about common daily problems and enjoying situations that we all can relate to.  This is one of her well-known stand-up shows that was a huge success in the United States.

The album peaked at number 30 on the Billboard Top Heatseekers charts.

Track listing
All material written by Ellen DeGeneres
"Camping And Hunting" – 6:07
"Iroquois Indians" – 3:20
"Children" – 4:06
"Tourettes" – 1:22
"Airplanes" – 11:29
"Scary Things" – 4:51
"Embarrassing Moments" – 2:30
"Licking A Frog" – 3:27
"Depends And Leg Warmers" – 2:14
"Cat In Heat" – 3:33
"Birds Mating" – 1:48
"Phone Call To God" – 4:17
"Stupid Things" – 4:22
"Public Bathrooms" – 7:00

References

External links

Ellen DeGeneres website

Ellen DeGeneres albums
1990s comedy albums